Rien Michael Long (born August 7, 1981) is a former American college and professional football player who was a defensive tackle in the National Football League (NFL) for three seasons during the early 2000s.  He played college football for Washington State University, earned All-American honors, and was recognized as the top college interior lineman.  The Tennessee Titans chose him in the fourth round of the 2003 NFL Draft, and he played for the Titans until his pro career was cut short by injuries.

Early years
Long was born in Los Angeles, California.  He attended Anacortes High School in Anacortes, Washington.

College career
Long accepted an athletic scholarship to attend Washington State University, where he played for the Washington State Cougars football team from 2000 to 2002.  As a junior in 2002, he won the Outland Trophy as that year's best college football interior lineman, and was recognized as a consensus first-team All-American.

Professional career

Tennessee Titans
The Titans drafted him in the fourth round in 2003, and he started five of 39 games through his first three seasons with 9½ career sacks and 99 career tackles. He missed the 2006 season with a torn Achilles' tendon, then was placed on injured reserve for 2007 with a knee injury before being waived.

Florida Tuskers
Long was drafted by the Florida Tuskers on the UFL Premiere Season Draft in 2009 and signed with the team on September 3. He was released on September 22.

Television career

Animal Planet

Long co-starred in Going Native with his brother Devan Long.  The pair subject themselves to the 9,000-year-old rites of passage of the Tatooya tribe in the Colombian Amazon to begin their journey into manhood, including ceremonial vomiting, blowdart hunting and ritual whipping.  The show first aired on June 7, 2015.

Personal
Long is of one-fourth Armenian descent and cherishes his heritage greatly. He has a tattoo of the seventh letter of the Armenian alphabet (Է) over the Armenian flag on his biceps. Rien Long's trip to Armenia and Nagorno-Karabakh in March 2006 was the subject of a feature-length documentary, "The Long Journey from the NFL to Armenia" Rien has one son by the name of Gavon who plays soccer, football, and basketball in  Anacortes (www.globalistfilms.com).

Just before midnight on January 21, 2008, Long crashed his 2005 Ford Mustang into a rock wall while driving too fast on an I-40 on-ramp near downtown Nashville. Long was taken to Vanderbilt University Medical Center where he suffered injuries that left him in critical condition.

References

External links
  Rien Long – Washington State Cougars player profile

1981 births
Living people
All-American college football players
American football defensive tackles
American people of Armenian descent
Ethnic Armenian sportspeople
Florida Tuskers players
Tennessee Titans players
Washington State Cougars football players